Vittring is a 1978 studio album by Swedish pop and rock artist Magnus Uggla. Released in September 1978, it was his fourth studio album. The album was recorded with the English punk rock band Stadium Dogs.

"Stjärn...r" is a Swedish version of "Star Star" by The Rolling Stones.
"Å, han kysste mej" is a cover of "Then He Kissed Me" by The Crystals.

"Vittring", on the other hand was covered by Belgian artist Plastic Bertrand as "Rock'n'roll, je te hais" with completely unrelated lyrics in French.

Track listing
Side one
 "Drömmen som gick i kras" ("The Dream That Fell Apart") - 1:43
 "Jag vill inte gå hit" ("I Don't Want to Go Here") - 3:24
 "Asfaltbarn" ("Concrete Kid") - 2:32
 "Hjärtekrossare" ("Heartbreaker") - 2:53
 "Stjärn…r" - 2:23
 "Faderskapet" ("Paternity") - 3:08
Side two
 "Nugen" - 2:45
 "Vittring" ("Scent") - 3:05
 "Å, han kysste mej" ("Then He Kissed Me") - 2:15
 "Gud, jag ska bli bra" ("God, I Will Be Good") - 3:58
 "Lena" - 4:33

Charts

References

External links

1978 albums
Magnus Uggla albums
Swedish-language albums